The men's football tournament at the 2018 Central American and Caribbean Games was held in Barranquilla from 20 to 31 July. Men's teams are allowed to augment their squads with three players over the age of 21.

Participating teams

Squads

The date of birth for male athletes is from January 1, 1997 (U21). Each team may enter a maximum of three (3) male athletes without age restrictions.

Group stage
Tie-breakers 

 a) greatest number of points obtained in all group matches;
 b) goal difference in all group matches;
 c) greatest number of goals scored in all group matches;

If two or more teams are equal on the basis of the above three criteria, their rankings will be determined as follows:
 d) greatest number of points obtained in the group matches between the teams concerned;
 e) goal difference resulting from the group matches between the teams concerned;
 f) greater number of goals scored in all group matches between the teams concerned;
 g) drawing of lots

Group A

Group B

Knockout stage
If necessary, extra time and penalty shoot-out are used to decide the winner.

Semi-finals

Bronze medal match

Gold medal match

Goalscorers

References 

men